The New York Army National Guard is a component of the New York National Guard and the Army National Guard.  Nationwide, the Army National Guard comprises approximately one half of the United States Army's available combat forces and approximately one third of its support organization.  National coordination of various state National Guard units are maintained through the National Guard Bureau.

The New York Army National Guard maintains 57 armories, 21 Field and Combined Support Maintenance facilities, and three Army Aviation Support Facilities. New York Army National Guard units are trained and equipped as part of the United States Army.  The same ranks and insignia are used and National Guardsmen are eligible to receive all United States military awards. The New York Guard also bestows a number of state awards for local services rendered in or to the state of New York.

The New York Army National Guard is a division of the Army National Guard, and although they are under control of the state, they can be federalized (as all Army National Guard units can), and will remain aligned with the federal government over the state government if requirements of the two conflict.

History
During the American Revolution, New York City was occupied by the British 1775-1783; many of the Military companies existing prior to the war were broken up and enlisting in the Continental service. In 1786 the Militia was reestablished; the regiments in New York City were:
Isaac Stoundenberg's 1st Regiment.
Morris Lewis's 2nd Regiment.
Aaron Burr's 3rd Regiment.
Richard Varick's 4th Regiment
Sebastian Bauman's New York City Regiment of Artilley.

American Civil War
Before the formal creation of the New York Army National Guard, the State of New York mobilized a number of militia regiments for short terms of service in the Union Army during moments of crisis in the American Civil War.

The militia regiments that New York mobilized included:
2nd Regiment New York State State Militia Infantry mustered into volunteer service as the 82nd New York Volunteer Infantry Regiment.

4th Regiment National Guard Infantry was raised on June 18, 1863, for 30 days service in response to Robert E. Lee's invasion of Pennsylvania in June of that year. It served in Pennsylvania and was mustered out of service on July 24, 1863.
5th Regiment National Guard Infantry was raised on June 18, 1863, for 30 days service in response to Robert E. Lee's invasion of Pennsylvania in June of that year.  It served in Pennsylvania and was mustered out of service on July 22, 1863.
6th Regiment National Guard Infantry was raised on June 18, 1863, for 30 days service in response to Robert E. Lee's invasion of Pennsylvania in June of that year.  It served in Baltimore, Maryland, as part of the garrison of that city, and was mustered out of service on July 22, 1863.
8th Regiment National Guard Infantry (formerly 8th Regiment, New York State Militia) was mustered in on May 29, 1862, for 90 days service. It served in the defenses of Washington, DC, as part of the garrison of that city, and was mustered out of service on September 9, 1862. It was called up for a second time in June, 1863, for 30 days service in response to Robert E. Lee's invasion of Pennsylvania in June of that year. It served in Harrisburg, Pennsylvania, as part of the garrison of that city and 1st Brigade, 1st Division, Dept. of the Susquehanna, and was mustered out of service on July 23, 1863.
22nd Regiment National Guard Infantry served May 28, 1862, to July 24, 1863
25th Regiment National Guard Infantry was raised on May 31, 1862, for three months service. It served in the garrison of Suffolk, Virginia, and was mustered out of service on September 8, 1862.
28th Regiment National Guard Infantry was raised on June 20, 1863, in response to Robert E. Lee's invasion of Pennsylvania in June of that year. It saw no action during the campaign, and then returned to New York City to help suppress the draft riots there. It was mustered out on July 23, 1863. It was called up for a second time on September 2, 1864, for 100 days service and mustered out on November 13, 1864.
37th Regiment National Guard Infantry was raised on May 29, 1862, for three months service. It served in the Middle Department and was mustered out on September 2, 1862. It was mustered a second time for 30 days service during the Gettysburg Campaign on June 18, 1863, and mustered out on July 22, 1863. The 37th was mustered a third time for 30 days on May 6, 1864, for guard duty at New York's harbor. It mustered out June 6, 1864.

The New York State Militia was active by the mid-1880s. In 1889 a group of wealthy equestrian enthusiasts were incorporated into the State Militia as Squadron A. Their heritage is carried on today by the 101st Cavalry Regiment.

New York Army National Guard
The New York Army National Guard was formally created in 1906.  The Militia Act of 1903 organized the various state militias into the present National Guard system. The New York Army National Guard dispatched elements of the 27th Infantry Division and the 42nd Infantry Division to both world wars. Douglas MacArthur served as an officer and brigade commander in the 42nd Infantry Division during the First World War.

In the early 1960s, the NY ARNG included the 102nd Artillery Brigade (Air Defense), part of Army Air Defense Command, which in 1962 comprised 1-245, 2-209, 1-244, and 1-212 Artillery, equipped with a variety of missile systems.

For much of the final decades of the twentieth century, National Guard personnel typically served "One weekend a month, two weeks a year", with a portion working for the Guard in a full-time capacity.

In 1993, the 1st Battalion, 107th Infantry Regiment, was deactivated as part of nationwide force structure reductions. The 107th designation was reassigned to the former 205th Support Group, New York Army National Guard, creating the 107th Support Group.

Twenty-first century

Since the 9/11 Attacks on New York City, New York Army National Guard Soldiers were brought back into force in 2003 to help in the "Ice Storm". Soon after that, they were deployed to Iraq and Afghanistan in support of the Global War on Terror, as well as faced an increase in domestic missions.

The current forces formation plans of the US Army call for the typical National Guard unit (or National Guardsman) to serve one year of active duty for every three years of service.  More specifically, current United States Department of Defense policy is that no Guardsman will be involuntarily activated for a total of more than 24 months (cumulative) in one six-year enlistment period. This policy was due to change on 1 August 2007; the new policy stated that soldiers will be given 24 months between deployments of no more than 24 months. However, individual states have differing policies.

The 2nd Battalion, 108th Infantry Regiment deployed to Iraq in 2004 along with the 105th MP Company. In 2004/2005 the 1st Battalion, 69th Infantry, along with Delta Company 1st Battalion, 101st Cavalry, served in Iraq; eventually assuming responsibility for security on the Baghdad International Airport Road.

In 2004 the Division Headquarters and division base units of the 42nd Infantry Division, the "Rainbow" Division, were mobilized for service in Iraq. The 42nd Infantry Division, took over responsibility for the area known as Multi-National Division North Central—the provinces of Salah Ah Din, Diyala, At Tamamim (or Kirkuk Province) and As Sulymaniah Province from the 1st Infantry Division on February 14, 2005. The 42nd Combat Aviation Brigade also deployed to Iraq during this period.

At one point during 2005 almost 3,500 members of the New York Army National Guard were serving in Iraq. Task Force Liberty, led by the 42nd Infantry Division, comprised 23,000 Soldiers including two Active Duty Army Brigades of the 3rd Infantry Division, the 278th Regimental Combat Team of the Tennessee Army National Guard, and the 116th Cavalry Brigade Combat Team from the Pacific Northwest.

About 25 NY ARNG soldiers deployed to Iraq in Sep 2006 as part of the 36th Combat Aviation Brigade.

In 2008 the 27th Brigade Combat Team was mobilized with the role of training Afghan National Army and Police forces in Afghanistan (Task Force Phoenix). The 2nd Squadron, 101st Cavalry deployed with the 27th BCT. Members of the 2nd Battalion, 108th Infantry, and 1st Battalion 69th Infantry, filled out vacancies in the deploying units. The brigade returned late 2008.

The 3rd Battalion, 142nd Aviation (Assault Helicopter) deployed to Iraq in late summer of 2008 in support of Multi-National Corps – Iraq, as did the 133rd Quartermaster Company. The battalion returned to New York in the spring of 2009.

The 27th Brigade Combat Team received a notification of sourcing and deployed to Afghanistan in February 2012. The various units within the 27th BCT were assigned various missions throughout Afghanistan, Kuwait, and Bahrain.

The HHD/107th Support Group has recently been reorganized and redesignated several times and is now the 53rd Army Digital Liaison Team.

Structure
The New York Army National Guard's structure as of October 2019 is as follows:

42nd Infantry Division

 Headquarters and Support Company, 42nd Infantry Division in Troy
 Signal Company, 42nd Division in Staten Island
42d Army Band in Cortlandt Manor
 Intelligence and Sustainment Company, 42nd Infantry Division in Troy
Operation Company, 42nd Infantry Division in Buffalo
27th Infantry Brigade Combat Team
Headquarters and Headquarters Company, 27th Brigade Combat Team in Syracuse
2nd Squadron, 101st Cavalry Regiment
Headquarters and Headquarters Troop in Niagara Falls
Troop A in Geneva
Troop B in Jamestown
Troop C in Buffalo
Company D, 427th Brigade Support Battalion in Buffalo
1st Battalion, 69th Infantry Regiment
 Headquarters and Headquarters Company in Manhattan
Company B in Farmingdale
Company C in Cortlandt Manor
Detachment 1 in Manhattan
Company D in Farmindale
Company F, 427th Brigade Support Battalion in Farmingdale
2nd Battalion, 108th Infantry Regiment
Headquarters and Headquarters Company in Utica
Company A in Geneseo
Company B in Morrisonville
Detachment 1 in Ogdensburg
Detachment 2 in Saranac Lake
Company C in Gloversville
Detachment 1 in Leeds
Company D in Ithaca
1st Battalion, 258th Field Artillery Regiment
Headquarters and Headquarters Battery in Queens
Battery A in New Windsor
Battery B in The Bronx
Battery C in Queens
Company G, 427th Brigade Support Battalion in Queens
152nd Brigade Engineer Battalion
Headquarters and Headquarters Company in Buffalo
Company A in Manhattan
Company B in Lockport
Company C in Buffalo
Company D in Syracuse
1st Detachment in Rochester
Company E, 427th Brigade Support Battalion in Buffalo
Combat Aviation Brigade, 42d Infantry Division
Headquarters and Headquarters Company, CAB in Latham
3rd Battalion, 142nd Aviation Regiment in Ronkonkoma
Headquarters and Headquarters Company in Ronkonkoma
Company A in Latham
Company B in Ronkonkoma
Company D in Latham
Company E in Farmingdale
Detachment 2, Company A, 1st Battalion (Security & Support), 224th Aviation Regiment in Latham
Detachment 3, Company E, 3rd Battalion, 142nd Aviation Regiment in Latham
1st Battalion (General Support), 171st Aviation Regiment
 Detachment 2, Headquarters and Headquarters Company in Rochester
 Company C in Rochester
 Detachment 2, Company D in Rochester
 Detachment 1, Company E in Rochester
642nd Aviation Support Battalion  in Rochester`
Headquarters and Headquarters Company in Rochester
Detachment 2, Headquarters and Headquarters Company, 3rd Battalion, 126th Aviation Regiment in Rochester
Detachment 1, Company B, 3rd Battalion, 126th Aviation Regiment in Rochester
Detachment 2, Company D, 3rd Battalion, 126th Aviation Regiment in Rochester
Detachment 2, Company E, 3rd Battalion, 126th Aviation Regiment in Rochester
Company A in Dunkirk
1st Detachment in Olean
Company B in Ronkonkoma
Company C in Brooklyn

53rd Troop Command

Headquarters and Headquarters Detachment in Cortlandt Manor
138th Chaplain Support Team in Cortlandt Manor
138th Public Affairs Detachment in Cortlandt Manor
53rd Support Detachment, Digital Liaison Detachment in Manhattan
101st Signal Battalion
Headquarters and Headquarters Detachment in Yonkers
Company A in Peekskill
Company B in Orangeburg
Company C in Yonkers
204th Engineer Battalion
Headquarters and Headquarters Detachment in Binghamton
204th Engineer Detachment (Quarry) in Binghamton
 827th Engineer Company (Horizontal) in Horseheads
Detachment 1 in Walton
1156th Engineer Company (Vertical) in Corlandt Manor
Detachment 1 in Kingston
Forward Support Company in Binghamton
152d Engineer Company (Support) in Buffalo
501st Ordnance Battalion (Explosive Ordnance Disposal)
Headquarters and Headquarters Detachment in Glenville
1108th Ordnance Company (EOD) in Glenville
1427th Transportation Company (Medium Truck) in Queensbury
Detachment 1 at Fort Drum
466th Medical Company (Area) in Queensbury
369th Sustainment Brigade
Headquarters and Headquarters Detachment in New York City
27th Finance Management Battalion
 Headquarters and Headquarters Detachment in Whitestone
4th Finance Detachment in Whitestone
7th Finance Detachment in Whitestone
 14th Finance Detachment in Whitestone
37th Finance Detachment in Manhattan
187th Signal Company in Farmingdale
719th Transportation Company in Manhattan
Detachment 1 in Staten Island
1569th Transportation Company in New Windsor
133d Supply Company (Composite) in Brooklyn
 145th Maintenance Company in Staten Island
153rd Troop Command
Headquarters and Headquarters Detachment in Buffalo
102nd Military Police Battalion, Auburn
105th Military Police Company in Buffalo
206th Military Police Company in Latham
Detachment 1 in Utica
222d Military Police Company in Rochester
Detachment 1 in Hornell
104th Military Police Battalion
Headquarters and Headquarters Detachment in Kingston
 107th Military Police Company in Brooklyn
442d Military Police Company in Jamaica [Queens 
727th Military Police Law and Order Detachment in Cortlandt Manor
222nd Chemical Company in Brooklyn

Historic units
  244th Air Defense Artillery Regiment
 245th Coast Artillery Regiment
  127th Armor Regiment
  174th Armor Regiment
  205th Armor Regiment
  208th Armor Regiment
  210th Armor Regiment
  101st Cavalry Regiment
  105th Infantry Regiment
 106th Infantry Regiment
 HHC/108th Support Group, one of only nineteen Army National Guard units with campaign credit for the War of 1812
 93rd Infantry Brigade
 71st Infantry Regiment
 (165th Infantry) 69th Infantry Regiment
 369th Infantry Regiment
  174th Infantry Regiment
 242nd Infantry Regiment
 104th Field Artillery Battalion
 105th Field Artillery Battalion
 106th Armored Field Artillery Battalion
  156th Field Artillery Regiment
 170th Field Artillery Battalion
 186th Armored Field Artillery Battalion
  186th Field Artillery Regiment
 187th Field Artillery Battalion
 226th Field Artillery Battalion
 249th Armored Field Artillery Battalion
 270th Field Artillery Battalion
  207th Coast Artillery (AA)
  212th Coast Artillery (AA)
  152nd Engineer Battalion

See also
 Chauncey Pratt Williams
 Joint Task Force Empire Shield

References

External links
Bibliography of New York Army National Guard History compiled by the United States Army Center of Military History
The Civil War Archive
New York Army National Guard, accessed 22 Dec 2016
GlobalSecurity.org, New York Army National Guard, accessed 26 Nov 2006
Unit Designations in the Army Modular Force, accessed 23 Nov 2006
History of the Twenty-second Regiment of the National Guard of the State of New York..., Volume 22, Part 4 1896

Military in New York (state)
United States Army National Guard by state
1906 establishments in New York (state)